Ahmad Hajji (born 11 February 1972) is a Kuwaiti footballer. He competed in the men's tournament at the 1992 Summer Olympics.

References

1972 births
Living people
Kuwaiti footballers
Kuwait international footballers
Olympic footballers of Kuwait
Footballers at the 1992 Summer Olympics
Place of birth missing (living people)
Association football defenders
Kuwait Premier League players